Stolen Sleep, issued in 2009 on Inner-X-Musick (catalog IX-001), was SLEEPCHAMBER's first studio release featuring all new music in over 15 years. The album featured the lineup of John Zewizz, Bob Avakian and Gimmie Sparks, with help from Zora and Tick. It was recorded at Zewizz's home studio and Copperhead Studios in Boston. The cover art was done by San Francisco-based artist KayTwo.

Track listing
 Temple ov Isis
 Sleep Stealer
 Tomb
 Nightsuit
 Cult ov Anubus
 Aura ov Datura
 Kum Kleopatra Kum
 Into the Crypt

References
http://www.discogs.com/Sleepchamber-Stolen-Sleep/release/1796478
http://www.freewebs.com/theebradmiller/stolensleep.htm

2009 albums